Mads Roerslev Rasmussen (born 24 June 1999) is a Danish professional footballer who plays as a right-back for  club Brentford. He is a product of the FC Copenhagen academy and was capped by Denmark at youth level.

Club career

FC Copenhagen
A right-back, Roerslev progressed through the academy at F.C. Copenhagen and made his senior debut as a second-half substitute for Frederik Bay in a Danish Cup third round match versus Jammerbugt FC on 26 October 2016. He capped a dream debut with a goal in the 6–1 victory. Roerslev made four further appearances during the 2016–17 season and signed a new four-year contract in May 2017. Down the pecking order at the Parken Stadium, he later spent time away on loan at Halmstads BK and Vendsyssel FF, but made few appearances for either club. Roerslev departed FC Copenhagen in August 2019, after making 13 appearances and scoring one goal during three seasons as a senior player at the club.

Brentford

2019–2021 
On 7 August 2019, Roerslev moved to England to join the B team at Championship club Brentford on a two-year contract, with the option of a further year, for an undisclosed nominal fee. Roerslev broke into the first team squad in October 2019 and by March 2020, after 10 appearances, his performances led to him signing a new four-year contract and being promoted into the first team squad. Roerslev finished the 2019–20 season with 14 appearances, but a metatarsal injury suffered on international duty saw him miss the first four months of the 2020–21 season. Roerslev returned to match play in early January 2021 and after a number of substitute cameos, an injury to his mentor, Henrik Dalsgaard, allowed him to break into the starting lineup in early April. He held onto his place until the end of the regular season and through the playoffs, which culminated in promotion to the Premier League after victory in the 2021 Championship play-off Final, during which he assisted Emiliano Marcondes for one of the goals. Roerslev finished a breakthrough 2020–21 season with 22 appearances.

2021–present 
Following the release of first-choice right back Henrik Dalsgaard, a change in formation to 3-5-2 saw Roerslev begin the 2021–22 season behind stand-in right wing back Sergi Canós in the pecking order and the pair traded the position through the season. Approaching the midway point of the season, mounting injuries in the central defensive positions saw Roerslev deployed in a right centre back role. He finished the 2021–22 season with 26 appearances and one goal, scored with the winner in a 2–1 Premier League victory over Aston Villa on 2 January 2022.

After beginning the 2022–23 behind new signing Aaron Hickey and right-sided central defender Kristoffer Ajer in the right back pecking order, injuries to both players led to Roerslev assuming the starting right back role in mid-October 2022. He signed a new three-year contract in February 2023.

International career
Roerslev was capped Denmark at every level between U17 and U21. He was a member of the Denmark squads at the 2016, 2018 and 2021 UEFA European U17, U19 and U21 Championships respectively. In May 2022, Roerslev was called into the senior team's training camp prior to its 2022–23 UEFA Nations League A matches.

Style of play
A right-back, Roerslev "is very good offensively – he is a good crosser of the ball, very good one-on-one, quick and energetic to get up and down the pitch. He is also good defending one-on-one".

Career statistics

Honours
Brentford
EFL Championship play-offs: 2021

References

External links

Mads Roerslev at brentfordfc.com

1999 births
Living people
Footballers from Copenhagen
Danish men's footballers
Denmark youth international footballers
Denmark under-21 international footballers
Association football defenders
F.C. Copenhagen players
Vendsyssel FF players
Brentford F.C. players
Danish Superliga players
Allsvenskan players
English Football League players
Danish expatriate men's footballers
Expatriate footballers in England
Expatriate footballers in Sweden
Danish expatriate sportspeople in England
Danish expatriate sportspeople in Sweden
Premier League players